Besieged City is a 2008 Hong Kong film directed by Lawrence Ah Mon. It has a Category III rating in Hong Kong.

Elizabeth Kerr wrote in The Hollywood Reporter, "[Besieged City] is a quasi-realist Hong Kong urban drama", and film critic Paul Fonoroff wrote that Besieged City was the "21st-century sequel" of Lawrence Ah Mon's 1988 debut feature film Gangs. The title refers to Tin Shui Wai, a satellite town in the northwestern New Territories of Hong Kong.

Cast
Cast and roles include:
 Tang Tak Po as Ho Ling-kit
 Wong Yat Ho as Ho Chun-kit
 Wong Hau Yan as Panadoll
 Joman Chiang
 Jonathan Cheung as Chu Hin
 Dada Chan Ching as Ceci
 Joman Chiang as Yee-wah
 Sunny Luk

Film critic Paul Fonoroff wrote, "The mixture of the realistic and theatric attains a consistency due in large part to the naturalism of its cast of screen neophytes, a quality that has always been a hallmark of Lau's youth films, most recently in Spacked Out (2000) and Gimme Gimme (2001).

Awards and nominations
Besieged City was nominated twice at the 27th Hong Kong Film Awards in 2008:
 Best New Performer - Wong Hau-Yan
 Best Art Direction - Yank Wong

See also
 The Way We Are, a 2008 film directed by Ann Hui, set in Tin Shui Wai.

References

Further reading

External links
 
 HK cinemagic entry
 Love HK Film entry

Hong Kong drama films
2008 films
Films directed by Lawrence Ah Mon
Films set in Hong Kong
Tin Shui Wai
2000s Hong Kong films